Gypsonoma rubescens is a species of moth of the family Tortricidae. It is found in China (Tianjin, Henan, Sichuan, Guizhou, Yunnan, Shaanxi, Qinghai).

References

Moths described in 1971
Eucosmini